The Chapel of St. Oran, was a chapel dedicated to Saint Oran at Kiloran located on the Inner Hebridean island of Colonsay, Scotland.

A chapel, potentially rebuilt was noticed at the site in 1695. The ruins of the chapel were incorporated into Colonsay House which was built in 1722. A well, known as Tobar Oran, is located 90 metres east of Colonsay House.

The chapel had a barn located nearby, which according to tradition was part of a monastic abbey, and was known as Sabhal Bàn.

Citations

References
Martin Martin: A Description of the Western Islands of Scotland, in A Description of the Western Islands of Scotland Circa 1695, edited by Donald J. Macleod, Edinburgh, Birlinn 1994, .
Kevin Byrne (1997), Colkitto! A Celebration of Clan Donald of Colonsay 1570-1647 

Archaeological sites in the Southern Inner Hebrides
Colonsay
Churches in Argyll and Bute
Former churches in Scotland